Gary Spani (born January 9, 1956) is a former NFL linebacker who played for the Kansas City Chiefs from 1978–1986.  He has worked for the Chiefs' front office since 1989, and is currently the Director of Special Events for the Chiefs.

Spani was born in Satanta, Kansas, but raised in Manhattan, Kansas, and graduated from Manhattan High School.  He played college football at Kansas State University.  At Kansas State, he was a three-time All Big Eight Conference selection, was conference defensive player of the year in 1977, and was named the school's first consensus All American in 1977.  He still holds the all-time tackles record for Kansas State University.  Following graduation, Spani was named MVP of the East-West Shrine Game.

The Chiefs selected Spani in the third round of the 1978 NFL Draft.  As a professional, Spani was a hardnosed and tenacious player.  He was a team captain for the Chiefs in 1983.  He formerly held the all-time tackles record for the Kansas City Chiefs, where he registered 999 career stops.   His single-season record of 157 tackles with the Chiefs, set in 1979, stood until 2002 when it was broken by Mike Maslowski. He also recorded 9.5 sacks, recovered 9 fumbles and scored 2 touchdowns during his Chiefs career.

Spani was elected to the College Football Hall of Fame in 2002 and the Kansas City Chiefs Hall of Fame in 2003.

Daughter Shalin Spani played college basketball for the Kansas State University Wildcats from 2007–2010.  She later married K-State star quarterback and Heisman Trophy finalist Collin Klein. Daughter Taber Spani plays college basketball for the Tennessee Lady Vols. His third daughter, Tanis Spani, is a member of the Southwest Baptist University Lady Bearcat basketball team.

References

1956 births
Living people
People from Haskell County, Kansas
Sportspeople from Manhattan, Kansas
All-American college football players
American football linebackers
Kansas State Wildcats football players
Kansas City Chiefs players
College Football Hall of Fame inductees